Russell Arthur Missin (15 July 1922 – 28 November 2002) was an English cathedral organist, who served in Newcastle Cathedral.

Background
He was born in Wisbech, Cambridgeshire on 15 July 1922. Missin's parents lived in a small village, Gorefield just outside Wisbech.  He was awarded his FRCO CHM in 1947 and took a Doctor in Theology (Church Music) degree from Geneva Theological College, America.   He also held the A.D.C.M. (Archbishop of Canterbury's Diploma in Church Music)

He was married to Muriel, and they had two sons.

Career
Assistant organist at Ely Cathedral 1945 - 1949

Organist of:
St Mary's Church, Thetford
St Giles, Cambridge
Holbeach Parish Church
All Saints' Church, Oakham 1950 - 1956
St. Mary's Church, Nottingham 1957 – 1967
Newcastle Cathedral 1967 – 1987
Christ Church, North Shields 1989 - 1999

References

English classical organists
British male organists
Cathedral organists
1922 births
2002 deaths
People from Wisbech
Fellows of the Royal College of Organists
Musicians from Cambridgeshire
20th-century classical musicians
20th-century English musicians
20th-century organists
20th-century British male musicians
Male classical organists